Stefan Müller is a professor of linguistics at the Humboldt University of Berlin specializing in syntax, where he is the head of the German Grammar group.

Education and career

Stefan Müller was born in Jena in 1968, majoring in computer science, linguistics, and computational linguistics at the Humboldt University. After this he held various research and teaching positions in the public and private sectors, at the Humboldt University, the German Research Center for Artificial Intelligence in Saarbrücken (DFKI), Interprice Berlin, the Friedrich-Schiller University at Jena, the University of Potsdam, and the Freie University, Berlin.

Many of his publications and the LaTeX code used to typeset them are open-access, and he is one of the founders of the open access publisher Language Science Press.

He was elected a member of Academia Europaea in 2014.

Research
Müller's research focus is the empirical description of German and other Germanic languages and the theoretical modelling of these descriptive findings, the relation of this work to linguistic typology, and with the use of the Head-driven phrase structure grammar framework. Because of the implications that typological findings have for different analyses of languages and linguistic phenomena, the description and analysis of non-Germanic languages also feature prominently in the programme - Müller himself works with Mandarin, Danish, Maltese, and Persian.

Publications
 Müller, S. (2018). Evaluating theories: Counting nodes and the question of constituency. To appear in Language under Discussion, a review copy on academia.edu.
 Mensching, G., Müller, S., Werner, F., and Winckel, E. (2018). Asymmetries in Long-Distance Dependencies: A View from Gradient Harmonic Grammar. Paper presented at Jahrestagung der deutschen Gesellschaft der Sprachwissenschaft, 8 March 2018. 
 Müller, S. (2016) Grammatical theory: From transformational grammar to constraint-based approaches. Textbooks in Language Sciences no. 1. Berlin: Language Science Press. Available for free as a PDF on the publisher's site, as well as links to github LaTeX source.
 Müller, S. (2010). Grammatiktheorie. Stauffenburg Einführungen no. 20. Tübingen: Stauffenburg Verlag. (Second, modified edition 2013).   Made available by the Humboldt University's website.
 Müller, S. (2008). Depictive secondary predicates in German and English. In: Grübel, R., Hentschel, G., Kohler, G.-B., Schroeder, C., Boeder, W. (eds.) Studia Slavica Oldenburgensia: Secondary predicates in Eastern European languages and beyond. BIS-Verlag, Oldenburg. Made available on academia.edu.
 Müller, S. (2007). Head-Driven Phrase Structure Grammar: Eine Einführung. Stauffenburg Einführungen no. 17. Tübingen: Stauffenburg Verlag. (second, modified edition 2008; third, modified edition 2013).   Made available via the Humboldt University's website.
 Müller, S. (2002) Complex Predicates: Verbal Complexes, Resultative Constructions, and Particle Verbs in German. Studies in Constraint-Based Lexicalism no. 13. Stanford: CSLI Publications. Made available by the author and unglue.it.
 Müller, S. (1999). Deutsche Syntax deklarativ. Head-Driven Phrase Structure Grammar für das Deutsche. Linguistische Arbeiten, No. 394, Tübingen: Max Niemeyer Verlag. Made available by the author.

References

Linguists from Germany
Living people
1968 births
Humboldt University of Berlin alumni
Academic staff of the Humboldt University of Berlin
Alumni of the University of Edinburgh
Saarland University alumni
People from Jena
Computational linguistics researchers
Members of Academia Europaea
Academic staff of the University of Bremen
Academic staff of the Free University of Berlin
Germanists
21st-century linguists
Academic staff of Saarland University